The 1997 Villanova Wildcats football team represented Villanova University during the 1997 NCAA Division I-AA football season. It was the program's 100th season and they finished as Atlantic 10 Conference (A-10) champions after posting a perfect 8–0 record in conference play. The Wildcats earned a berth as the #1 seed into the 16-team Division I-AA playoffs, but lost in the quarterfinals to eventual national champion Youngstown State, 34–37. Villanova was led by 13th-year head coach Andy Talley. Villanova finished the year ranked #1 in the nation according to The Sports Network's final poll, which was released prior to the playoffs starting.

Among the many postseason awards received, coach Talley was honored as the AFCA Coach of the Year and Eddie Robinson Award winner for being the Division I-AA national coach of the year. Senior wide receiver Brian Finneran received the Walter Payton Award, which is given to the nation's top offensive player.

Schedule

Roster

Awards and honors
Walter Payton Award – Brian Finneran
First Team All-America – Chris Boden (Walter Camp); Brian Finneran (Associated Press, The Sports Network, AFCA, Walter Camp)
First Team All-Atlantic 10 – Chris Boden, Brian Finneran, Jason Tenner
Second Team All-Atlantic 10 – George Freiberger, Mark Kiefer
Third Team All-Atlantic 10 – Josh Dolbin, Ryan Knight, Shaun Lyons, Chris Machovina, Mitch McCrimmon, Shannon Riley
AFCA Coach of the Year Award – Andy Talley
Eddie Robinson Award – Andy Talley
Atlantic 10 Coach of the Year – Andy Talley

References

Villanova
Villanova Wildcats football seasons
Atlantic 10 Conference football champion seasons
Villanova Wildcats football